Doreen St. Félix (born 1992) is a Haitian-American writer. She is a staff writer for The New Yorker and was formerly editor-at-large for Lenny Letter, a newsletter from Lena Dunham and Jenni Konner.

Early life 
St. Félix attended Brown University, where she edited the weekly newspaper, The College Hill Independent. She graduated in 2014.

Career 
St. Félix has written for The New York Times Magazine and Pitchfork, as well as serving as an editor for Lena Dunham and Jenni Konner's newsletter, Lenny Letter. St. Félix now writes for The New Yorker.

Critical reception and honors 
St. Félix won a National Magazine Award in Columns and Commentary
in 2019. She was a finalist in the same category in 2017 for her writing at MTV News. In 2016, Forbes Magazine named St. Félix to its 30 Under 30 list, citing her work on the Lenny Letter launch, with the newsletter reaching 400,000 subscribers in under six months. i-D called her "a guiding voice in the worlds of writing, art and activism." Brooklyn Magazine named St. Félix to its 2016 list of the "100 Most Influential People in Brooklyn Culture," calling her Pitchfork essay on Rihanna "definitive." The Huffington Post named the same essay to its list of "The Most Important Writing From People Of Color In 2015", NPR called it "excellent" and Paper Magazine described it as "the best damn thing ever written re. Rihanna."

Other projects 
St. Félix co-hosted a podcast at MTV News with Ira Madison III called Speed Dial with Ira and Doreen, focused on music, pop culture, sex and race.

Personal life 
St. Félix lives in Brooklyn, New York.

Bibliography

Essays and reporting

Columns from newyorker.com
 
 
 
 
———————
Notes

References

External links
 Doreen St. Félix on Twitter
 Interview with Doreen St. Félix on the For Colored Nerds podcast (July 30, 2016)
 Interview with Doreen St. Félix on the Call Your Girlfriend podcast (September 23, 2016)
 Interview with Doreen St. Félix on the Longform podcast (October 26, 2016)
 Interview with Doreen St. Félix on the Talk Easy podcast (July 30, 2017)

1993 births
Living people
21st-century American non-fiction writers
Brown University alumni
American music critics
MTV News
The New Yorker people
American women non-fiction writers
21st-century American journalists
American women journalists
21st-century American women writers
American writers of Haitian descent